is a 2005 Japanese film directed by Kazuyuki Izutsu.

Plot

Romeo, A.K.A. Kosuke Matsuyama (Shun Shioya), is a second-year high school student. A nice, normal, nonviolent type, he suddenly finds himself in the middle of a rampaging crowd of Korean boys, outraged by insults perpetrated by several of his idiotic classmates on two Korean girls. He makes a narrow escape, but soon after, he and his best bud Yoshio (Keisuke Koide) are sent by their home-room teacher to invite the Korean students to a friendly soccer game as a way of restoring the peace.

Trembling like black-uniformed leaves, they enter enemy territory, where Kosuke encounters a doll-faced, but serious-looking girl, Lee Kyung-ja (Erika Sawajiri) playing a Korean folk song, "Rimjin River," on a flute. He and Yoshio are also nearly lynched by her older brother Lee An-sung (Sosuke Takaoka) and his gang, but he is already smitten—and eager to learn that haunting tune.

The story concentrates on Kosuke's struggle to not only master a song but win the love of a girl who seems to live in an alien, hostile world. Meanwhile, Ang Son and his crew are street-fighting with Japanese toughs as if playing a contact sport, with one side scoring hits, then the other. He is macho to a fault, but when he learns that his sweetheart (Kyoko Yanagihara) is pregnant and determined to keep the baby, he faces a choice that makes him quail: grow up or cop-out.

Cast
 Shun Shioya as Kosuke Matsuyama (松山浩介), the main protagonist and a second-year student who falls in love with a girl of Korean origin, Lee Kyung-ja.
 Keisuke Koide as Norio Yoshida (吉田紀男), Kosuke Matsuyama's best friend.
 Sousuke Takaoka as Lee An-sung (이안성/イ・アンソン), a Zainichi Korean troublemaker who is the hot headed older brother of Lee Kyung-ja. 
 Erika Sawajiri as Lee Kyung-ja (이경자/イ・キョンジャ), a Zainichi Korean student who studies in a North korean school in Kyoto and Lee An-sung's shy younger sister who dreams of becoming a movie star. She's also the love interest of Kosuke Matsuyama.
 Kazuki Namioka as Motoki Bang-ho (모토키 방호/モトキ・バンホー), Lee An-sung's best friend.
 Hiroyuki Onoue as Park Jae-dok (박재독/パク・ジェドク), Lee An-sung's younger brother.
 Kyoko Yanagihara as Momoko (桃子), Lee An-sung's girlfriend who gets pregnant by him, making him make a decision about his life.
 Yoko Maki as Chun Gang-ja (전강자/チョン・ガンジャ), the best martial artist in the North korean school and the friend of Lee An-sung, Motoki and Jae-dok.
 Noriko Eguchi as Hyeyoung (혜영/ヘヨン), Chun Gang-ja's best friend

Awards
48th Blue Ribbon Awards
 Won: Best Film
27th Yokohama Film Festival
 Won: Best Film
 Won: Best Director - Kazuyuki Izutsu
 Won: Best Cinematography - Hideo Yamamoto
 Won: Best Newcomer - Erika Sawajiri and Shun Shioya

References

2005 films
Films directed by Kazuyuki Izutsu
2000s Japanese-language films
Best Film Kinema Junpo Award winners
Zainichi Korean culture
2000s Japanese films